Jenifer Abaho Muheesi is a Ugandan women's representative member of parliament for Kazo District under the National Resistance Movement (NRM) in the eleventh Parliament of Uganda

Education background 
Jenifer sat her Uganda certificate of Education from Kibura Girls Secondary School

Controversies 
Former State Minister for Economic Monitoring, Molly Kamukama  filed a petition blocking the nomination of Jennifer Muheesi as the NRM flag bearer for Kazo District Woman Member of Parliament. That was dismissed by The High Court in Mbarara claiming that the National Resistance Movement primaries were marred with irregularities after Molly was defeated

Related links 

 Website of the Parliament of Uganda
 List of members of the eleventh Parliament of Uganda

References 

Living people
Year of birth missing (living people)
National Resistance Movement politicians
Members of the Parliament of Uganda
21st-century Ugandan women politicians
21st-century Ugandan politicians
Parliament of Uganda